An alternative news agency (or alternative news service) operates in a similar fashion to a commercial news agency, but defines itself as an alternative to commercial or "mainstream" operations. They span the political spectrum, but most frequently are progressive or radical left. Sometimes they combine the services of a news agency and a news syndicate. Among the primary clients are alternative weekly newspapers.

Examples

Active
 All Headline News
 Alternet
 Association of Alternative Newsmedia/AltWeeklies.com
 Choike.org (North/South issues)
 Collegiate Press Service (in its commercial incarnation)
 Compass Direct
 Inter Press Service (North/South issues)
 Mathaba News Agency
 Openreporter
 Pacific Free Press
 Pressat
 Pacific News Service
 The Reggae News Agency
 Syndicated News
 Scoop Analytics

Defunct
Alternative Press Features
 Atlantic Free Press
 Associated Negro Press (1919–1964)
 Appalachian News Service (from c. 1974)
 Collegiate Press Service — student-run project of the United States Student Press Association (Washington, DC); transformed into independent collective (Denver, Colorado)
 Community Press Features (from c. 1971)
 Dispatch News Service — the original outlet to purchase Seymour Hersh's story about the My Lai Massacre during the Vietnam War
 Earth News Service (from c. 1972); later renamed Newscript Dispatch Service
 FPS (from c. 1971) — high school student news service with a sanitized name: "Free Public Schools"
 Her Say (from c. 1977) — founded by Marlene Edmunds of Zodiac News Service
 The International Human Press (2010– 2020) — founded as a user-generated news site by college students from Arizona State University, University of Washington, and Tulane University
 Liberation News Service (1967–1981) — splintered off from Collegiate Press Service
 New Liberation News Service
 New York News Service (from c. 1973) — founded by Rex Weiner and Deanne Stillman
 People's Translation Service (from c. 1972)
 Tricontinental News Service (from c. 1973)
 Underground Press Syndicate; renamed Alternative Press Syndicate (1966–1978)
 Zodiac News service (from c. 1972)
 Zoo World Newservice (from c. 1972)

See also
 Alternative media

References

Voices from the Underground (Vol. 2): A Directory of Resources and Sources on the Vietnam Era Underground Press. Has article about the Underground Press Syndicate and other period alternative news services.

Alternative press
News agencies